Paduka Sri Sultan Muzzil Shah ibni al-Marhum Sultan Muhammad Shah (died 24 August 1280) was the fourth Sultan of Kedah. His reign was from 1237 to 1280. He moved his new capital to Kota Sungai Mas  from Kota Meriam.

External links
 List of Sultans of Kedah

1280 deaths
13th-century Sultans of Kedah